Reece Hewat (born 25 September 1997) is a South African-born Australian rugby union player who plays for Section Paloise in the Top 14 competition.  His position of choice is loose forward.

References

External links
 

Australian rugby union players
1997 births
Living people
Rugby union players from Johannesburg
Queensland Reds players